Yingshang County is a county in the northwest of Anhui province, China. It is under the jurisdiction of the prefecture-level city of Fuyang. The Huai River, which frequently floods, forms part of the county's southern border.

Yingshang is an agricultural county with wheat and rice are the main crops, with a million tons of food produced each year from 2007 to 2016.

The county has proven iron ore reserves registering in the hundreds of millions of tons. Coal reserves are estimated at 100 million tons.

Administrative divisions
In the present, Yingshang County has 21 towns, 7 townships and 1 ethic townships.
21 towns

7 townships

1 ethic townships
 Hui Saijian Township

Climate

References

Fuyang
County-level divisions of Anhui